is a train station in the town of Kawanehon, Haibara District, Shizuoka Prefecture, Japan, operated by the Ōigawa Railway.

Lines

Station layout
The station has one side platform serving a single track, and a small shelter for passengers. There is no station building, and the station is unattended.

Adjacent stations

|-
!colspan=5|Ōigawa Railway

Station history
Hiranda Station was opened on October 2, 1990, when part of the Ikawa Line was re-routed to avoid the rising waters of the lake created by the Nagashima Dam.

Passenger statistics
In fiscal 2017, the station was used by an average of 0.3 passengers daily (boarding passengers only).

Surrounding area
Located in an isolated mountain area surrounded by forests, it has very few passengers.

In media 
The 3rd episode of the TV series "Tetsu Ota Michiko, 20,000 km" is dedicated to this station

See also
 List of Railway Stations in Japan

References

External links

 Ōigawa Railway home page

Stations of Ōigawa Railway
Railway stations in Shizuoka Prefecture
Railway stations in Japan opened in 1959
Kawanehon, Shizuoka